Brežice is a town in eastern Slovenia in the Lower Sava Valley, near the Croatian border. It is the seat of the Municipality of Brežice. It lies in the center of the Brežice Plain, which is part of the larger Krka Flat. The area was traditionally divided between Lower Styria (territory on the left bank of the Sava River) and Lower Carniola (territory on the right bank of the Sava River). The entire municipality is now included in the Lower Sava Statistical Region.

Brežice prides itself on a rich historical and cultural heritage. The Lower Sava Valley Museum, housed in Brežice Castle, contains archaeological and ethnological exhibits, exhibits on the Croatian and Slovenian peasant revolt, and a modern history collection. It is one of the largest regional museums in the country. A more recent landmark addition to the town is its water tower, as well as the double arches of the 527 m long iron bridge, which spans the Sava and Krka rivers.

History
Celtic graves from the 2nd century BC have been discovered in Brežice, and it has been continuously settled since prehistoric times. A Slavic settlement called Gradišče was established at the site soon after the arrival of the Slovenes in the area. The castle in Brežice was first mentioned in 1249. The current structure dates to 1529.

Brežice was affected by Ottoman raids several times during the 15th and 16th centuries. Peasant uprisings took place during the 16th century; in 1515 peasants attacked the castle in Brežice, burned it, and killed the nobility sheltering in it. The new castle was able to withstand the peasant uprising of 1573.

The first school was established in Brežice in 1668, taught by Franciscan friars at the friary. From 1774 to 1780 instruction took place at Baron Moscon's residence, and from 1780 to 1820 at the rectory. A separate school building was built in 1875.

A general hospital was established in Brežice in 1872. Its facilities were expanded in 1889.

During the Second World War, Brežice and the adjacent countryside to the north and west were known as the Rann Triangle, an area intended for the resettlement of Gottschee Germans that had been evicted from the Gottschee region in the territory annexed by Italy.

Brežice expanded after the Second World War by annexing the neighboring villages of Brezina, Črnč, Šentlenart, Trnje, and Zakot.

Churches
Saint Lawrence's Church in Brežice was first mentioned in written sources in the 12th century. It stood on the bank of the Sava (now an old side channel). It and the adjacent cemetery were heavily damaged by flooding in 1781, which also changed the course of the river, and the current church was built in the town center in 1782. Brežice has been the seat of a parish since 1641. Another church in the town, built in the second half of the 17th century, is dedicated to Saint Roch.

Main Sights

Brežice Castle 
Brežice Castle is the dominant feature of the town, standing above the left bank of the Sava. It is now a museum housing several collections and exhibitions. In the castle chapel there is an altar by Luka Mislej.

Water Tower

The Brežice Water Tower is the most prominent structure in the town, and is regarded as its symbol. Built in 1914, it was a key part of the town's water supply system until in was replaced by a new reservoir in 1972, after which it had an auxiliary role until 1983.

Education

Brežice Upper Secondary School 
The Brežice Upper Secondary School opened in 1945, is built on the site of a Franciscan friary. The school was renovated in 1966, when an extension was also added. 690 students attend the school.

Brežice Faculty of Tourism 
The Faculty of Tourism was founded in December 2009 and is part of the University of Maribor, Slovenia's second-largest university. It is located in the center of the town on the main street, Cesta prvih borcev. In the 2012–2013 academic year it enrolled the first class of students in two three-year undergraduate programs in tourism: a vocational program and a bachelor's program. The faculty will also offer a master's program in tourism starting in the 2014–2015 academic year.

Notable people
Notable people that were born or lived in Brežice include:

 Jurij Rovan (born 1975), pole vaulter
 Ivo Benkovič (1875–?), politician
 Albin Bregar (?–1894), religious writer
 Vojko Černelč (born 1934), editor and journalist
 Mirjan Damaška (born 1931), jurist
 Vanda Gerlovič (1925–2001), opera singer
 Anton Gvajc (1865–1935), painter
 Vera Horvat, (1906–?), painter
 Primož Kozmus (born 1979), Olympic and world hammer throw champion
 Anton Krošl (1905–1945), historian
 Jože Krošl (1894–1978), theologian and sociologist
 Franc Kruljc (1873–1954), theologian
 Dušan Kuščer (1920–), geologist
 Boris Lipužič (1930–), geographer
 Janez Mencinger (1838–1912), writer, translator, and lawyer
 Avgust Munda (1886–1971), ichthyologist

 Tomaž Petrovič (born 1979), football manager
 Leopold Poljanec (1872–1944), natural history expert
 Ljudmila Poljanec (1874–1948), poet
 Miloš Poljanšek (born 1923), Slavic studies specialist
 Karel Přibil (1877–1944), education expert and translator
 Georgius de Rain (14th century – 1416), religious writer
 Radoslav Razlag (1826–1880), poet and politician
 Željko Ražnatović (1952–2000), Serb paramilitary leader, also known as "Arkan"
 Lavoslav Schwentner (1865–1952), publisher
 Marjan Sidaritsch (1895–1925), agricultural geographer
 Boris Sikošek (born 1922), geologist and tectonics expert
 Gvidon Srebre (1839–1926), lawyer and politician
 Franjo Stiplovšek (1898–1963), painter and graphic artist
 Viktor Tiller (1878–1961), local historian and geographer
 Andrej Urek (1836–1904), poet
 Jaka Žorga (1888–1942), politician

Gallery

See also
Brežice railway station

References

External links

Brežice on Geopedia

 
Populated places in the Municipality of Brežice
Cities and towns in Styria (Slovenia)